Vadim Vacarciuc (born October 1, 1972 in Răuțel, Făleşti) is a retired male weightlifter from Moldova. He competed in four consecutive Summer Olympics for his native Eastern European country, starting in 1996.

Vacarciuc is best known for winning the silver medal in the men's light-heavyweight division (– 94 kg) at the 2000 European Weightlifting Championships in Sofia, Bulgaria. He twice carried the flag for Moldova at the opening ceremony of the Summer Olympics: in 1996 and 2000.

Political activity 

Vacarciuc is a member of the Liberal Party of Moldova. In April 2009 polls, he became one of the party's MPs and in the July 2009 polls, he was re-elected.  He joined the Liberal Party Reform Council in 2013.

References 

1972 births
Living people
People from Fălești District
Moldovan male weightlifters
Weightlifters at the 1996 Summer Olympics
Weightlifters at the 2000 Summer Olympics
Weightlifters at the 2004 Summer Olympics
Weightlifters at the 2008 Summer Olympics
Olympic weightlifters of Moldova
Liberal Party (Moldova) MPs
Moldovan MPs 2009
Moldovan MPs 2009–2010
Romanian Popular Party politicians
European Weightlifting Championships medalists
World Weightlifting Championships medalists
20th-century Moldovan people
21st-century Moldovan people